Syed Imran Ali Warsi (born 5 June 1985) is a Pakistani field hockey player. He competed in the men's tournament at the 2008 Summer Olympics.

References

External links
 

1985 births
Living people
Pakistani male field hockey players
Olympic field hockey players of Pakistan
Field hockey players at the 2008 Summer Olympics
Place of birth missing (living people)
Commonwealth Games medallists in field hockey
Commonwealth Games silver medallists for Pakistan
Field hockey players at the 2006 Commonwealth Games
21st-century Pakistani people
Medallists at the 2006 Commonwealth Games